Leininger Peak is a peak,  high, standing at the north side of the base of Eielson Peninsula, on the east coast of Palmer Land, Antarctica. The peak was photographed from the air by the Ronne Antarctic Research Expedition (RARE) under Finn Ronne, 1947–48, and charted in 1947 by a joint sledge party consisting of members of the RARE and the Falkland Islands Dependencies Survey. It was named by Ronne for Commander Joseph A. Leininger, U.S. Navy Reserve, who devised the plans for the loading of cargo and the alterations on the expedition ship.

References

Mountains of Palmer Land